Orca Book Publishers is a Canadian company that produces books for children.

Organization 
Orca Book Publishers was founded in 1982 and is based in Victoria, British Columbia.

Orca primarily published children's literature, printing usually around 95 publications per annum. Andrew Wooldridge is the company's publisher, Ruth Linka is the associate publisher,  Sara Harvey is an editor.

History 
In 2019, Orca introduced a non-fiction line of books branded as Orca Issues. Orca published Eric Walters' pandemic novel Don't Stand So Close To Me in 2020. The book was published within 41 days of Walter's pitching the idea to Orca.

15,000 of the company's books caught fire while on the MV Zim Kingston vessel near Victoria, British Columbia in October 2021. In 2022, the company moved production of its books from China and Korea to Canada.

Notable publications 

 The Bonemender (book series)
 The King of Jam Sandwiches
 The Lottery (Beth Goobie)
 Weird Rules to Follow

References

External links 
 Official website

1982 establishments in British Columbia
Canadian booksellers
Children's book publishers
Companies based in Victoria, British Columbia